Soubré Department is a department of Nawa Region in Bas-Sassandra District, Ivory Coast. In 2021, its population was 587,441 and its seat is the settlement of Soubré. The sub-prefectures of the department are Grand-Zattry, Liliyo, Okrouyo, and Soubré.

History

Soubré Department was created in 1980 as a split-off from Sassandra Department. Using current boundaries as a reference, from 1980 to 2013 the department occupied the same territory as Nawa Region, with the exception of Guéyo Department.

In 1997, regions were introduced as new first-level subdivisions of Ivory Coast; as a result, all departments were converted into second-level subdivisions. Soubré Department was included in Bas-Sassandra Region.

In 2011, districts were introduced as new first-level subdivisions of Ivory Coast. At the same time, regions were reorganised and became second-level subdivisions and all departments were converted into third-level subdivisions. At this time, Soubré Department became part of Nawa Region in Bas-Sassandra District.

In 2012, four sub-prefectures were split from Soubré Department to create Buyo Department and Méagui Department.

Notes

Departments of Nawa Region
1980 establishments in Ivory Coast
States and territories established in 1980